Online communication between home and school is the use of digital telecommunication to convey information and ideas between teachers, students, parents, and school administrators.  As the use of e-mail and the internet becomes even more widespread, these tools become more valuable and useful in education for the purposes of increasing learning for students, and facilitating conversations between students, parents, and schools.

Overview 

Online communication emphasizes 21st century skills, self-directed learning, self-advocacy, global awareness, and thinking skills for learners.  Utilizing online communication methods, schools help students develop Netiquette, and technical and computer skills.  In addition, teachers can provide parents with frequent information about school programs and their children's progress through automated e-mails, official websites and learning management systems. This communication can be achieved either synchronously or asynchronously, providing greater time flexibility.

With online communication, learning may occur outside traditional school hours as students participate in collaborative activities, like reading and responding to peer posts in online forums, experiments, group projects, research papers, and current events assignments.   In addition, online communication can connect a wide range of individuals and increase the diversity of perspectives that learners are exposed to.

However, not all parents, students, or teachers have access to unlimited internet access or the digital technology necessary to participate in online communication, and it may be costly to initially implement the information technology, hardware, and software.  Furthermore, schools must provide orientation to the online environments and technical support to ensure that all potential users are ready to participate.  Teachers will also need to spend additional time online as active participants in the communication activities (e.g. act as the moderators of discussions).  In addition, the immediacy of online communication can lead to students and parents' unreasonable expectations that teachers be 'on-call' at all times. During the COVID-19 pandemic many students were abruptly forced to move their education to an online platform. Students at first were largely unprepared for the rapid shift to online-only learning and struggled to adjust, while at the same time they encountered a lack of coping resources.

COVID-19[edit] 
During 2019 the world was put into a state of crisis due to the Coronavirus pandemic, often referred to as COVID-19. This forced a majority of cities across the world to move work and school online. A large majority of schools ranging from elementary schools to universities were forced to move their schooling online. "It is estimated that 1.5 billion students worldwide have been impacted by Covid-19 (Teräs et al. 2020) with much face-to-face teaching rapidly moving to the online environment". Many students and faculty were not prepared for this sudden change to the online format and there were a-lot of challenges that came with this. Julie Apker states in her research article "students at first were largely unprepared for the rapid shift to online-only learning and struggled to adjust, while at the same time they encountered a lack of coping resources (e.g., reduced access to instructors and classmates, lack of counseling and social networks) (Kaufmann, Vallade, & Frisby, 2021; Wang et al., 2020). As COVID-19 evolves, students still encounter stress related to pandemic-impacted learning environments" this change made it hard for students to get appropriate coping resources as many students felt added stress due to the change of online learning and the pandemic in general as many were forced to stay in their homes longer than they are used to. This meant that people were getting cabin fever of sorts and not getting the face to face interaction that many humans need. The move also lead to problems with international students not being able to break the communication barrier online and some of these students felt as though this change drastically effected their ability to communicate questions with professors and get the help that is needed when learning. It is common for there to be language barriers between international students or anyone that is learning in a language that is not their first but when classes were in person it allowed them to have non verbal cues which helped bridge some of these gaps. When students were sent online it made it hard for there to be any other form of communication besides verbal and if you are unfamiliar with certain words learning can be a struggle. This is not even taking into account that people talk differently and it is harder to hear people when they are talking on a video camera vs in person. It also made it hard for people to interrupt class and ask questions. Covid also affected the communication between students who were trying to get help from tutors, between some students having a language barrier and others trying to figure out how to learn via and online platform it made bridging the gap extremely difficult for students.

Online communication between parents and school 

Online communication between parents and schools are online methods that serve as a platform for parents and teachers to exchange ideas.  For teachers and administrators, online communication makes it easier to reach the parents and build the partnerships with parents. Online communication allows parents to receive real-time information about their child's performance and activities at school, and flexible opportunities to ask questions and provide information to teachers and school administrators. Currently, one third of internet users are children or adolescents (Berman & Albright, 2017). Lenhart (2015) indicates that an estimated 71% of adolescents in 2015 reported using Facebook, and that social media use is typically enacted in more than one domain. This quote indicates that a vast majority of internet users are children, making them extremely comfortable with online platforms and technology.

Benefits 

Creating modes for online communication can increase parent participation in their children's education, which in turn increases students’ interest in their learning.  Online communication increases parents’ understanding of classroom procedures, philosophies and policies.  Parents then feel more involved in their child's school and more connected to the teacher.  In general, online communication improves parents’ attitudes toward conferencing with teachers and administrators.

This style of communication allows for more asynchronous communication and greater flexibility.  With online communication, parents can initiate conversations and express concerns to teachers and school officials easily.  In addition, informal communication through online chatting or forums can reduce parents’ anxiety of meeting face-to-face with teachers and/or school officials.  When possible, online communication can also offer comfort through anonymity.

Challenges 

Though most of the time, teachers and parents want to establish communication, there are some challenges that teacher and parents need to face together.  The most common challenges involve parent's ability to use the software, their access to consistent internet access and language barriers.  There may be financial costs incurred by the school, if they provide training or translation to parents in order to make online communication more inclusive. Some teachers have noted a "huge volume" of aggressive emails or messages from parents due to the accessibility of online communication apps. Teachers have also felt the need to respond during the evenings and weekends with expectations of daily communication from parents.

Online communication between students and teachers 
Online communication between teachers and students facilitates the exchange of ideas and e-learning. Online communication allows students to access learning materials beyond school hours and develop relationships with peers and teachers.

Benefits 

The creation of Web 2.0 and social networks means that knowledge is now collective and readily available online for students to access and contribute to. Promoting online communication between teachers and students creates opportunities for students to receive feedback and assistance from teachers and peers outside the regular school day and classroom.  Student can e-mail or post questions, add their opinions to peer-discussions, and check official websites for pertinent information.

Through online learning communities of teachers and peers, students can build relationships with other users and establish a sense of both connectedness and belonging.  Some students, who are less likely to participate in face-to discussions, are more likely to participate in online discussions and activities.  This online communication enhances the strength of the relationships between students and both their peers and teachers.

Challenges 

Student can demonstrate antipathy towards online communication or peer interdependency in internet forums.  In order to be productive, online communication between students and teachers requires trust, interactivity, common expectations and shared goals.  Some students expect teachers to be on-call 24 hours a day, 7 days a week, placing unreasonable expectations upon teachers. In addition, most students spend participate in online communication from home, which means that parent's help is often required, but may not be available.  Finally, students may lack the technical skills or access to the technology necessary to involve themselves in online communication.

Role of teachers 

Teachers have great responsibility in the establishment of online communication and communities with students, because of their leadership position.  Several of their in-class characteristics must extend into the online environment, such as their ability to guide student behavior and learning.  With online communication, teachers must model and demonstrate appropriate Netiquette throughout their persistent involvement.  Teachers should also encourage their classes to evolve into learning communities in which group processes have the power to influence the behavior of individuals. These online environments should foster a sense of openness, friendliness, and trust, so that problem solving becomes a group function.

Examples 

Teachers and students can e-mail questions and answers to each other about course content and assignments.  Schools and teachers can maintain official websites with important information about events, assignments, and resources that students can utilize outside class.

Both students and teachers can post messages in online forums as a part of homework assignments.  In this way they can present different points of view that they don't have any chance to present in the classroom.

Online study groups  allow students to maintain relationships with their peers from a distance.  These study groups can be created within a classroom's social networking site, allowing users to connect with each other directly, beyond typical chat rooms and forums.

Teachers can develop virtual tours, virtual education, and virtual learning environment for their students in multi-user virtual environments (MUVE).

Technology and tools 

The most widely used online communication tool is e-mail between teachers, which provides opportunities for asynchronous communication, instantaneous distribution to a mass audience, mobile access, and file exchange.  Teacher-created websites provide online access to administrative information, calendars, links, blogs, etc.  Internet forums allow learners and teachers to articulate ideas, give and receive feedback, reflect on the perspectives of others, and receive clarification of concepts.  social networking sites are used for focused and open communication between users.  Blogs allow individuals to express their ideas in greater detail and with multimedia. During this pandemic there were many platforms that allowed teachers to get in touch with their students and still teach from home. One very popular videoconferencing software site is called Zoom, this allowed students to receive a specific code to that particular class and allow a video stream of the class to continue education. Another popular video streaming site was Microsoft Teams, this streaming service is Microsofts video conferencing software that is linked with teachers and students school email. Due to the reduced resources students used many only tools to help them understand their school work. Some of these tools were Khan Academy, Chegg, Quizlet, and Grammarly. Along with these resources, some of the most impactful features of online education were the use of personal video calls with professors, e-mail, discussions boards, and blogs. These resources allowed students to still maintain their education while doing it from a safe place in the home instead of being in the classroom and being at risk.

Course management systems (CMS)

Various course management systems are designed specifically for facilitating online communication in education.  Effective course management software tends to include more information, widgets, functions, and customization options than teacher-created websites.

Most course management systems include:
 class information: calendar, syllabus, details of prerequisites, assessment information, and a FAQ
 a notice board with up-to-date course information
 learning materials: course content, copies of visual aids, reading materials and links to community resources
 assessment opportunities: self-assessment, peer-assessment, and formal assessment
 communication support: e-mail, threaded discussions, and a chat room
 differentiated access rights for teachers, administrators, and students
 document authoring tools
 administrative tools:  student tracking capabilities, statistics, and reports

References

Further reading

Amundson, Kristen(1999). Parents: Partners in Education. Parents as Partners Series.  Virginia. American Association of School Administrators.
Boyd, D., Ellison, N. (2007). Social network Sites: Definition, History, and Scholarship. Journal of Computer-Mediated Communication. Retrieved October 10, 2010.
Cooper, C., Crosnoe, R., Suizzo, M., Keenan, A. (2009). Elementary School Poverty, Race, and Parental Involvement During the Transition to Elementary School.  Journal of Family Issues, 31(7) 859-883.
Cuttance, Peter Cuttance and Stokes, Shirley A (2000). Reporting on Student and School Achievement. A Research Report prepared for the Commonwealth Department of Education, Training and Youth Affairs.
Diaz, D. P., & Cartnal, R. B. (1999). Students' Learning Styles in Two Classes. [Article]. College Teaching, 47(4), 130.
Enoch, S. W. (1995). The Dynamics of Home-School Relationships. School Administrator, 52(10), 24-26.
Grasha, A. F. (1996). Teaching with style. Pittsburgh, PA: Alliance.
Jenkins, H. (2006). Confronting the Challenges of Participatory Culture: Media Education for the 21st Century. MacArthur Foundation.  Retrieved October 10, 2010.
Jeynes, W. H. (2007). The Relationship between Parental Involvement and Urban Secondary School Student Academic Achievement: A Meta-Analysis. Urban Education, 42(1), 82-110.
Lewin, C., Luckin, R. (2009). Technology to support parental engagement in elementary education: Lessons learned from the UK.
Medina, M. (2001). Maintaining a Home–School Relationship. Retrieved October 10, 2010.
Northwest Educational Technical Consortium (2005). K-12 Online Instruction for Teaching and Learning. Retrieved October 14, 2010.
Resta, P., & Laferrière, T. (2007a). Technology in Support of Collaborative Learning. Educational Psychology Review, 19(1), 65-83. .
Roberts, T. S., & McInnerney, J. M. (2007). Seven Problems of Online Group Learning (and Their Solutions). Educational Technology & Society, 10 (4), 257-268.
Siemens G (2010) Struggling for a metaphor for change. Connectivism: Networked and Social Learning (2 Sept 2009 posting).
Souto-Manning, M., & Swick, K. J. (2006). Teachers’ Beliefs about Parent and Family Involvement: Rethinking our Family Involvement Paradigm.. Early Childhood Education Journal, 34(2), 187-193.
Swick, K. J., & Parker, M. S. (1989). Participation Patterns and Perceived Benefits of At-Risk Parents Involved in a Teacher-Parent Partnership Effort.
University of Illinois.  What Makes a Successful Online Student?. Illinois Online Network. Retrieved October 11, 2010.
Wanat, C. L. (2010). Challenges Balancing Collaboration and Independence in Home-School Relationships: Analysis of Parents' Perceptions in One District. School Community Journal, 20(1), 159-186.
Westergard, E., & Galloway, D. (2010). Partnership, Participation and Parental Disillusionment in Home-School Contacts: A Study in Two Schools in Norway. Pastoral Care in Education, 28(2), 97-107.

Educational technology
Computer-mediated communication